Spain took part in the Eurovision Song Contest 1964. The country was represented by Italian-Uruguayan band Los TNT with the song "Caracola", written by Fina de Calderón. The song was chosen through a national final, while the performers were chosen internally by TVE.

Before Eurovision

National final
The Spanish song was chosen during the TV show Gran Parada, hosted by Carmina Alonso and Ana María Solsona from Barcelona. It was the viewers that decided the winning song by sending postcards by mail. Each song was presented twice by two different singers. In the final that took place on 18 February, the song "Caracola" performed by Michel and Teresa María, respectively, was proclaimed the winner. After the show, TVE internally chose Los TNT, who had not taken part in the final, to perform the song in Copenhagen.

At Eurovision
Los TNT (as Nelly, Tim and Tony) performed last in the running order, following Belgium. They received a single point from Italy, coming 12th in a field of 16.

Voting

References

1964
Countries in the Eurovision Song Contest 1964
Eurovision